Jacob Esselens (1626, Amsterdam – 1687, Amsterdam), was a Dutch Golden Age landscape painter.

Biography
According to the RKD travelled to Kleve in 1663 and got married in 1668 in Amsterdam. He travelled in France and later to England as a silk merchant.

References

Jacob Esselens on Artnet

1626 births
1687 deaths
Dutch Golden Age painters
Dutch male painters
Painters from Amsterdam
Landscape painters